The Avon Park Historic District  is a U.S. historic district in Avon Park, Florida. On March 22, 1990, it was added to the U.S. National Register of Historic Places.

References

External links

 Highlands County listings at National Register of Historic Places

Avon Park, Florida
Geography of Highlands County, Florida
Historic districts on the National Register of Historic Places in Florida
National Register of Historic Places in Highlands County, Florida